Vasile Ţigănaş (born 2 January 1951) is a Romanian wrestler. He competed in the men's freestyle 82 kg at the 1980 Summer Olympics, where he got fourth place.

References

1951 births
Living people
Romanian male sport wrestlers
Olympic wrestlers of Romania
Wrestlers at the 1980 Summer Olympics
Place of birth missing (living people)